Kathleen Elizabeth Kelly (born June 2, 1987) is a former American-Canadian soccer player and current manager.

Early life
Born and raised in Kansas City, Missouri by parents Neil and Shelley Kelly, Katie, attended and played for St. Teresa's Academy. She earned many accolades while playing for the Stars, helping them to state titles in 2002, 2003 and 2005. During her time with the squad, she scored 32 goals and served 59 assists. During her freshman year, she was an all-state second-team selection and first-team all-district selection. She was named first-team all-state, all-conference, all-district and all-metro during her final three years. During her senior year, she was named Missouri State Player of the Year, Western Region Player of the Year and was a high school All-America selection.

Kelly played club for the 2001 National Champions, five-time USYSA Kansas State Champions, K.C. Dynamo, who also were Region II champions in 2001 and 2005 and finalists in 2000, 2002, 2003. She helped the Missouri State '86 Olympic Development Program (ODP) team to the National Championship in 2004.

Marquette University
Kelly attended Marquette University where she majored in Public Relations. As a freshman in 2005, Kelly became Marquette's corner kick specialist and provided an offensive threat from the back line. She scored three goals and served four assists finishing with 11 points. She was named Big East Conference Rookie of the Week after a goal and an assist in the win over Northwestern on August 28. She was named to the Soccer Buzz Great Lakes All-Freshman Team and was also an honorable mention Freshman All-American by Soccer Buzz. During her sophomore year, she started in all 23 matches and was Marquette's secret weapon on offense serving up a team high of eight assists for the season – third best single season total in program history. She registered 10 total points on the season to rank her fourth on the team. She was named the Big East Defensive Player of the Week and to the Soccer Buzz Elite Team of the Week for the second consecutive week. Kelly was the only player in the conference in 2006 to earn repeat defensive player of the week honors. She earned Soccer Buzz All- Great Lakes Third Team honors. In 2007 during her junior season, Kelly started in all 20 games and lead the team with nine assists. Her 0.45 assists per game for the season rank as the third-best average in single-season history at Marquette. Her nine assists ranked third in the Big East Conference that year and also ranked third on Marquette's all-time list. As an integral member of a Marquette defense that allowed just 17 goals on the season, and shut out nine teams, Kelly garnered several prestigious post-season honors, including a third team All-Big East selection and a spot on the Soccer Buzz Great Lakes Region second team. It was also the third consecutive year she was honored by Soccer Buzz. In addition, she was named to the NSCAA All-Great Lakes third team and the Top Drawer Soccer College Team of the Season first team. During her senior year, Kelly started all 22 games and ranked second on the team with 2,015 minutes played. She received Fourth Team All-America accolades by Soccer Buzz and was selected to the 2008 second team All-BIG East – the third All-BIG EAST selection of her career. She was also named to the 2008 NSCAA All-Great Lakes Region Third Team as well as the First Team All-Great Lakes by Soccer Buzz.

Playing career

Club

Kristianstads DFF
Kelly signed with Swedish side, Kristianstads DFF, in the Damallsvenskan for the 2010 season. She made 20 appearances for the squad with 12 starts for a total of 1,205 minutes.

FC Kansas City
In 2013, Kelly was signed by FC Kansas City as a discovery player headed into the inaugural season with the National Women's Soccer League.

Kansas City Courage 
Kelly played the 2017 season for KC Courage.

National team
In 2011 earned a call up by John Herdman for the Canada, but the defender didn't play for the team.

Coaching career

Avila University 
On 29 November 2017 was named as Head coach of the Women soccer team, of the Avila Eagles.

Personal life 
On 29 December 2017 she married dentist Brian LaForge and took his name.

References

External links
 Marquette University player profile
 

1987 births
Living people
Åland United players
American expatriate women's soccer players
American women's soccer players
Expatriate women's footballers in Finland
Expatriate women's footballers in Germany
Expatriate women's footballers in Sweden
FC Kansas City players
Hammarby Fotboll (women) players
Kristianstads DFF players
Marquette University alumni
Marquette Golden Eagles women's soccer players
National Women's Soccer League players
Soccer players from Kansas City, Missouri
Women's Premier Soccer League Elite players
Kansallinen Liiga players
Kokkola Futis 10 players
Women's association football defenders
F.C. Indiana players
Damallsvenskan players
Frauen-Bundesliga players
College women's soccer coaches in the United States